John Maxwell (born 13 October 1951 in Temora, New South Wales) is an Australian sport shooter. He competed at the Summer Olympics in 1988 and 1996; in 1988, he tied for 22nd place in the mixed trap event, while in 1996, he placed fourth in the men's trap event.

References

1951 births
Living people
Trap and double trap shooters
Australian male sport shooters
Shooters at the 1988 Summer Olympics
Shooters at the 1996 Summer Olympics
Olympic shooters of Australia
Commonwealth Games medallists in shooting
Commonwealth Games gold medallists for Australia
Commonwealth Games bronze medallists for Australia
Shooters at the 1990 Commonwealth Games
People from the Riverina
Sportsmen from New South Wales
20th-century Australian people
Medallists at the 1990 Commonwealth Games